Christ Lutheran Church is a congregation in the Andhra Evangelical Lutheran Church and is a member church of the West Godavari synod. It is a major A class parish and is a mother church to several smaller and younger congregations in and around Narsapur, West Godavari. The current pastors are Rev. V.Rajendra Sundar and Assist.pastor Rev.P.P.S.kiran. The church follows the Lutheran liturgical traditions.

History 
The corner stone was established in 1923 by Fr. Barger and Fr. Heyer and the Church was started in 1929 and is therefore more recent than other churches in the synod. Several pastors have ministered in this church including some Europeans in the early years. The church register is a rich historical record of the events that have taken place in the church since 1929.

Architecture 
The church is considered a landmark in the town. It is a beautiful brick structure. The church was built in the gothic architectural style with a brick exterior. The bell tower soars to an admirable height and houses a bell with an excellent tone. The bell was manufactured in Watervliet, New York by the Meneely Bell Foundry and was said at the time (1925) to have been "one of the finest church bells ever shipped" from the foundry. The church also has a beautiful stained glass for an altarpiece.

Current situation 

The church has celebrated its platinum jubilee. The church undergone major renovations for the same. New pews and chandeliers were installed.

External links

Churches in Andhra Pradesh
Buildings and structures in West Godavari district